Sheridan County is the name of five counties in the United States, each named for Philip Sheridan, a general in the American Civil War and the Indian Wars:

 Sheridan County, Kansas
 Sheridan County, Montana
 Sheridan County, Nebraska
 Sheridan County, North Dakota
 Sheridan County, Wyoming